The Bombay Cotton Exchange was a commodities exchange in Bombay (now Mumbai), India.

References 

Cotton organizations
Commodity exchanges in India